Thechikkottukavu Ramachandran (born ) is an elephant owned by Thechikottukavu devasom, a temple in Kerala. Commonly known as simply Raman, he is the second tallest living captive elephant in Asia after Chirakkal Kalidasan, standing at 321.5 cm.  they have also given Ramachandran the title Ekachatradhipathi, or The Only Emperor.

The partly blind elephant plays a key role in several Pooram festivals; in 2018, 50,000 spectators gathered to watch Ramachandran kickstart Thrissur Pooram at Thrissur’s Vadakkumnathan temple. However, he has been banned from public display on multiple occasions.

Incidents 
Due to Ramachandran's popularity, temples in Kerala have wanted Raman to carry God’s idol during temple festivals to attract a crowd. He has previously been banned by the authorities for causing the death of spectators. Subsequently, the ban was lifted and Raman was allowed to continue participating in festivals.

People close to Raman have claimed that the elephant is innocent in the majority of cases, claiming that the elephant has never killed people intentionally, but rather accidentally. Both Raman and his mahouts are subjected to criticism and harassment by the media and other elephant owners. However, Raman remains a widely loved and celebrated elephant in Kerala.

An attempt was made to kill Ramachandran by mixing blades in its feed.

Role in Thrissur Pooram
Thrissur Pooram is the largest Pooram festival. From 2011, Ramchandran has performed the Poora Vilambaram, which encompasses the elephant pushes open the south entrance gate of the Vadakkunnathan Temple, subsequently marking the beginning of Thrissur Pooram. After the 2019 incident in which Ramachandran trampled two people to death, the animal was banned from being paraded at temple festivals after a panel of medical experts deemed it medically unfit. The elephant was given a conditional nod on to participate in Thrissur Pooram on May 11th, after a team of three veterinarians had the elephant pass a fitness test and conducted a medical examination of the tusker.

See also
 List of individual elephants

References

1963 animal births
Individual elephants
Elephants in Indian culture
Individual animals in India
Elephants in Hinduism
Elephants in Kerala